China Today, until 1990 titled China Reconstructs, is a monthly magazine founded in 1952  by Soong Ching-ling in association with Israel Epstein. It is published in Chinese language, English, Spanish, French, Arabic, German and Turkish, and is an official outlet of the Chinese Communist Party, intended to promote knowledge of China's culture, geography, economy and social affairs as well as positive view of the People's Republic of China and its government to people outside of China.

Background and role in China 
Foreign advisor and naturalized Chinese citizen Israel Epstein was editor-in-chief of China Today from 1948, and later returned to China at the request of Soong Ching-ling. The magazine was renamed China Today in 1990.  China Today is usually published the first week of the month. The editors usually showcase what they characterize as the growing modernization and development which has happened in China since 1949.

The novelist, playwright and translator Gao Xingjian, who received the Nobel Prize in Literature in 2000, worked in the magazine as the chief of its French edition from 1975 to 1977. The actor, translator and politician Ying Ruocheng briefly worked for the English edition of the magazine in the 1970s. He went on to serve as China's vice minister of culture in the 1980s and played a supporting role in the 1987 Oscar-winning film The Last Emperor.

References

External links
 China Today official site
  Large, searchable, and downloadable archive, 1952- 2007. 

1952 establishments in China
Communist magazines
Cultural magazines
Magazines established in 1952
Magazines published in Beijing
Monthly magazines published in China
Multilingual magazines